Tarnawka  (Ternavka) is a village in the administrative district of Gmina Markowa, within Łańcut County, Subcarpathian Voivodeship, in south-eastern Poland.

The village has a population of 475.

References

Villages in Łańcut County